Dendrobium thyrsiflorum is a species of orchid, commonly called the pinecone-like raceme dendrobium. It is native to the Himalayas (Bhutan, Assam, Yunnan and Arunachal Pradesh) as well as to the mountains of northern Indochina (Myanmar, Thailand, Laos and Vietnam).

Two varieties are recognized:

Dendrobium thyrsiflorum var. minutiflorum Aver. - Laos
Dendrobium thyrsiflorum var. thyrsiflorum - most of species range

References

External links

IOSPE orchid photos, Dendrobium thyrsiflorum Rchb.f 1875, Photo courtesy of Patricia Harding. 
Santa Barbara Orchid Estate, Dendrobium thyrsiflorum
Orchid Web Presented by Orchids Unlimited (Plymouth Minnesota USA), Dendrobium thyrsiflorum
Clear Mountain Garden Treasures, Dendrobium thyrsiflorum

thyrsiflorum
Orchids of Asia
Flora of East Himalaya
Flora of Indo-China
Plants described in 1871